Norðdahl is an Icelandic surname. Notable people with the surname include:

 Birna Norðdahl (1920-2004), Icelandic chess master
 Eiríkur Örn Norðdahl (born 1978), Icelandic writer
 Magnús Norðdahl, Icelandic lawyer

See also
 Nordahl
 Norddal

Icelandic-language surnames